David Alejandro Rojina Reyes (born 16 June 1988, Nezahualcóyotl, Mexico) also known as David Ryes, is a Mexican former footballer who played as a central defender. Reyes began his career with Socio Águila in Mexico. In September 2009, Reyes signed for League of Ireland Premier Division club Bray Wanderers. He has played two games for the club and scored one goal. In January 2010 he got transferred to Club Tijuana.

References

1988 births
Living people
Liga MX players
Club América footballers
El Tanque Sisley players
Expatriate footballers in Uruguay
Mexican expatriate footballers
Footballers from the State of Mexico
People from Nezahualcóyotl
Bray Wanderers F.C. players
League of Ireland players
Association football defenders
Mexican footballers